Central Armed Police Forces (CAPF) is the collective name of central police organisations in India under the Ministry of Home Affairs (MHA). These are technically paramilitary forces formerly known as Central Para-Military Forces (CPMF). Since 2011, India adopted the term "central armed police forces" to drop the word "paramilitary". These forces are responsible for internal security and guarding the borders.

CAPF is further classified into three: Border Guarding Forces—Assam Rifles (AR), Border Security Force (BSF), Indo-Tibetan Border Police (ITBP), and Sashastra Seema Bal (SSB); Forces for Internal Security—Central Industrial Security Force (CISF) and Central Reserve Police Force (CRPF); and Special Task Force—National Security Guard (NSG).

History
CAPF were formerly known as Central Para-Military Forces (CPMF), also various referred by Central Police Organisations (CPOs), Para-Military Forces (PMF) and Central Police Forces (CPF) interchangeably. In 2011, the Government of India released a circular adopting a uniform nomenclature to change the name of the forces to Central Armed Police Forces under the Ministry of Home Affairs. Initially, only five forces—BSF, CRPF, CISF, ITBP and SSB were covered under the new nomenclature, since AR was under the operational control of the Indian Army and NSG personnel were completely deputed from the Indian Army and other CAPFs. The name change was made for political reasons, to improve the international impression of the force, since in some countries the paramilitary refers to militant groups.

Currently, all the seven forces are listed under the CAPF definition by the Ministry.

CAPF is further classified into three: Border Guarding Forces—Assam Rifles (AR), Border Security Force (BSF), Indo-Tibetan Border Police (ITBP), and Sashastra Seema Bal (SSB); Forces for Internal Security—Central Industrial Security Force (CISF) and Central Reserve Police Force (CRPF); and Special Task Force—National Security Guard (NSG).

Role 
Central Armed Police Forces are organised with the primary role of border guarding for AR, BSF, ITBP, SSB; Security of sensitive establishments by CISF, Assisting Police to tackle Law & Order, Counter-Terrorist Operations, Counter Naxal Operations by CRPF, NSG. Apart from the primary role, all CAPFs are involved in assisting Police in Law & Order situations and also Army in Counter-Terrorist Operations. BSF & CRPF have assisted the army during external aggression in the past. CAPFs work along with both Indian Army & Police in different roles assigned to them.

Central Armed Police Forces personnel also serve in various important organisations such as Research and Analysis Wing (RAW), Special Protection Group (SPG), National Investigation Agency (NIA), Intelligence Bureau (IB), Central Bureau of Investigation (CBI), National Disaster Response Force (NDRF), Narcotics Control Bureau (NCB) State Armed Police Force (Jharkhand Jaguars, Bihar Military Police, UP/MP STF, DRG, IRB, Chattishgarh Armed Police etc.) on deputation and have attachment/training in various levels/formations/courses along with the Indian Army. Their role and performance, therefore, assumes a great significance due to the special features of an emergency force which is pressed in aid to the civil power to perform multiple roles in extremely difficult situations.

Organisations

Assam Rifles
The Assam Rifles is a central police and paramilitary organisation responsible for border security, counter-insurgency, and law and order in Northeast India. Its primary role is to guard the 1,643 kilometre long Indo-Myanmar border. The AR comes under the administration of the Ministry of Home Affairs (MHA), while its operational control is maintained by the Indian Army. It is the oldest paramilitary force in India.

Border Security Force (BSF) 

The primary role of the Border Security Force is to guard the Indo-Pakistan and Indo-Bangladesh borders, it is deployed both on the international border and the LOC. The BSF also has active roles during times of war. It has 292,000 personnel in 192 battalions. The 1, 2 and 7 battalion of NDRF are requisitioned from BSF. It is also known for being the largest dedicated border guarding force in the world.

Central Industrial Security Force (CISF) 
One of the largest industrial security forces in the world, the Central Industrial Security Force provides security to various Public Sector Undertakings (PSUs) and other critical infrastructure installations, major airports across the country and provides security during elections and other internal security duties and VVIP protection. It has a total strength of about 144,418 personnel in 132 battalions including 9 reserve battalions.

Central Reserve Police Force (CRPF) 
The Central Reserve Police Force is the largest of the Central Armed Police Forces units with 313,678 personnel in 247 battalions. The Central Reserve Police includes:
The Rapid Action Force (RAF), a 15 battalion anti-riot force trained to respond to sectarian violence.
The Commando Battalion for Resolute Action (COBRA), a 10 battalion strong anti-Naxalite/COIN force.

Indo-Tibetan Border Police (ITBP) 
The Indo-Tibetan Border Police is deployed for guarding duties on the Indo-China border from Karakoram Pass in Ladakh to Diphu Pass in Arunachal Pradesh covering a total distance of 3,488 km. It has 89,432 personnel in 56 fighting battalions, 2 DM and 4 specialised battalions.

National Security Guard
The National Security Guard (NSG), commonly known as Black Cats, is a counter-terrorism unit under the Ministry of Home Affairs. It was founded on 16 October 1984 under the National Security Guard Act, 1986. All personnel are deputed from other CAPFs and the Indian Army.

Sashastra Seema Bal (SSB) 
The objective of the Sashastra Seema Bal (English: Armed Border Force) is to guard the Indo-Nepal and Indo-Bhutan borders. It has 76,337 personnel and 67 battalions, as well as some reserved battalions.

Personnel 
On 5 February 2019, the Supreme Court of India ruled that five CAPFs would be granted Non-Functional Financial Upgradation (NFFU), and the status of Organised Group ‘A’ Services (OGAS), ending a nearly decade-long battle for the central armed police. In the judgment by Rohinton Fali Nariman and M. R. Shah, the court said that officers from BSF, CRPF, SSB, ITBP, and CISF should be granted the NFFU and will be considered as Organised Group A Central Services.

In July 2019, the Union Cabinet granted Organised Group 'A' Service (OGAS) status to Group 'A' executive cadre officers of five Central Armed Police Forces (CAPF). It also extended the benefit of Non-Functional Financial Up-gradation(NFFU) and Non-Functional Selection Grade (NFSG) to the executive cadre officers at an enhanced rate of 30%.

Rank structure
Officers

Enlisted ranks

Recruitment
Recruitment of candidates to the CAPFs may be conducted by the Union Public Service Commission, the Staff Selection Commission, or the respective service HQs depending on the post to be filled.
Officers
Officers in CAPFs are recruited through the Central Armed Police Forces (Assistant Commandants) Examination conducted by UPSC. They are appointed as Assistant Commandants and are Gazetted Officers generally referred to as DAGOs (Directly Appointed Gazetted Officers) in CRPF, AC (Direct Entry) in BSF. DEGOs (Departmental Entry Gazetted Officers) are those officers who have been promoted through departmental exams conducted internally for Subordinate Officers. They are known as encounter specialists among police forces of India.

Enlisted ranks
Sub Inspectors are recruited through competitive examination conducted by Staff Selection Commission and they are referred to as DASOs (Directly Appointed Subordinate Officers). DESOs (Departmental Entry Subordinate Officers) are those officers who have been promoted through departmental exams conducted internally for Constables, Head Constables, and Assistant Sub Inspectors.

Constables are recruited through a competitive examination conducted by Staff Selection Commission. Apart from the above modes, CAPFs conduct recruitment for specialized posts such as Engineers, Doctors, etc. among DAGOs and Wireless operators, Technicians, Nursing Staff, etc. among subordinate officers and constables directly under their own authority (MoHF).

Women in CAPF
Women were not recruited for the Central Armed Police Forces, until 1992. Earlier, the role of women was limited to supervisory roles. The Parliamentary Committees of India for women's empowerment recommended expanding women's roles in CAPF. The Ministry of Home Affairs declared reservation for women in constabulary, and later declared that they can also be inducted as officers in combat roles in five CAPFs. The Union Home Minister announced that women's representation in the CRPF and CISF would be made 15 percent while it would be 5 percent in the BSF, ITBP and SSB. In 2016, it was decided that 33 percent of posts at the constabulary level would be reserved for women in the CRPF and the CISF, and 14-15 percent of posts at the constable level in the BSF, SSB and ITBP in a phased manner.

See also
State Armed Police Forces
Paramilitary forces of India
Law enforcement in India
Indian Armed Forces

Notes

References

External links

Law enforcement agencies of India
Central Armed Police Forces of India
Federal law enforcement agencies of India